Lamiņi Manor is a manor house in , Pūre Parish, Tukums Municipality in the historical region of Courland, in western Latvia.

History 
Lamiņi Manor was built between 1855 and 1856. 
In the mid-19th century manor was acquired by Ferman, a merchant from Riga, and new manor master house was built. It currently houses the Dzirciems special boarding school.

Manor park 
At the same time when the construction of the new manor master house was going on, Ferman ordered creation of a new manor park with decoratively trimmed trees intertwined with pathways, flower beds, and decorative ponds. In 1912 Lamiņi Manor park was characterized as a rare example of Old French and Rococo style park in the Baltics.

See also
List of palaces and manor houses in Latvia

References

External links
  Lamiņi Manor
  Dzirciems Special Boarding School

Manor houses in Latvia
Houses completed in 1856
Tukums Municipality
Courland